The Social Weather Stations or SWS is a social research institution in the Philippines founded in August 1985. It is a private,  non-stock, nonprofit institution. It is the foremost public-opinion polling body in the Philippines. As an independent institution, it formally registered on 8 August 1985.

The institution
As an independent institution, the SWS formally registered with the Philippine Securities and Exchange Commission or SEC on August 8, 1985. Its mission is to regularly do scientific social surveys for the sake of education  (so eyes may see social conditions), conscientization (so hearts may feel social problems); and analysis (so minds may understand their solutions).
Its basic functions include: social analysis and research, with stress on social indicators and the development of new data sources; design and implementation of social, economic, and political surveys, including public opinion polls;  and the dissemination of research findings through publications, seminars, briefings, and other channels.

Founding Fellows
 Dr. Mahar Mangahas (currently the President and CEO)
 Prof. Felipe B. Miranda
 Mercedes R. Abad
 Jose P. de Jesus
 Ma. Alcestis Abrea-Mangahas
 Gemino H. Abad
 Rosa Linda Tidalgo-Miranda

Social Weather Indicators
 Statistic Database
 Change in quality of life
 Expected change in quality of life
 Expected change in the economy
 Satisfaction with the President

See also
ASEAN
Economy of the Philippines

References

Further reading

External links

Public opinion research companies
Market research companies of the Philippines
Research institutes in Metro Manila
Organizations established in 1985
Companies based in Quezon City
1985 establishments in the Philippines